SMG was an American worldwide venue management group headquartered in West Conshohocken, Pennsylvania, that specialized in managing publicly owned facilities. It began their operation in 1977 with management of the Louisiana Superdome. It was one of the largest property management corporations in the world.

SMG was a joint venture in general partnership form with two equal principals, The Hyatt Hotel Company and Aramark Corporation. SMG was bought by American Capital in 2007 for US$631 million, and American Capital was sold to Ares Management in January 2017. Ares Management sold SMG to Onex Corporation in 2017. In October 2019, SMG and AEG Facilities merged to make a new company called ASM Global.

Properties managed

Arenas 

The company managed arenas in Canada, United Kingdom, Germany, Norway, United Arab Emirates, Puerto Rico, United States.

Convention centers 

It managed convention centers in Canada, Mexico, United States.

Stadiums 

It managed stadiums in Poland, United States.

Theatres 

It managed theatres in United Kingdom, Germany, United States.

Other venues 

Other types of managed venues were in Germany and United States.

References

External links 

Companies based in Philadelphia